Maurice Joseph "Red" Shannon (February 11, 1897 – April 12, 1970) born in Jersey City, New Jersey was an infielder for the Boston Braves (1915), Philadelphia Athletics (1917–1919 and 1920–21), Boston Red Sox (1919), Washington Senators (1920) and Chicago Cubs (1926).

Over the course of seven seasons, he played in 310 games and had 1,070 At Bats, 124 Runs, 277 Hits, 38 Doubles, 22 Triples, 91 RBI, 21 Stolen Bases, 109 Walks, a .259 Batting Average, .334 On-base percentage, .336 Slugging Percentage, 359 Total Bases and 29 Sacrifice Hits.

He was the twin brother of Joe Shannon, and the two played on the Braves during the 1915 season.  He died in his hometown at the age of 73.

Sources

1897 births
1970 deaths
Major League Baseball shortstops
Major League Baseball second basemen
Boston Braves players
Philadelphia Athletics players
Boston Red Sox players
Washington Senators (1901–1960) players
Chicago Cubs players
Baseball players from Jersey City, New Jersey
Rochester Hustlers players
New Haven Murlins players
Baltimore Orioles (IL) players
Newark Bears (IL) players
Columbus Senators players
Louisville Colonels (minor league) players
Indianapolis Indians players
Jersey City Skeeters players
Richmond Byrds players
Asbury Park Sea Urchins players
Seton Hall Pirates baseball players